Bruno Tommaso (born 1946) is an Italian jazz double-bass player and composer, the cousin of fellow double-bass player Giovanni Tommaso. The first president of the Italian Association of Jazz Musicians and a founding member of the Italian Instabile Orchestra, Tommaso has performed with such musicians as Enrico Rava, Mario Schiano, Franco d'Andrea, Eugenio Colombo and Enrico Pieranunzi, among others.

Discography

 w/ Roberto Rossi
 Original Soundtrack For Charles And Mary, Onyx Jazz Club, Matera, 2013. With Riccardo Parrucci, fl, Fabrizio Desideri, Rossano Emili, sax - cl, Marco Bartalini, flg, Gloria Merani, Marco Domenichelli, vl, Flaminia Zanelli, vla, Elisabetta Casapieri, vc, Marco Cattani, gtr, Andrea Pellegrini, p, Giacomo Riggi, vib, Nino Pellegrini, cb, Paolo Corsi, dr. Bruno Tommaso, compos., dir.

With the Italian Instabile Orchestra

As contributor

 Marche Jazz Orchestra, "Dies Irae", Philology, (1989)

References

1946 births
Free jazz double-bassists
Free improvisation
Italian jazz musicians
Living people
Avant-garde jazz double-bassists
21st-century double-bassists
Italian Instabile Orchestra members